Tania Modra, OAM (born 14 January 1975) is an Australian Paralympic tandem cycling pilot. Eighteen months before the 2000 Sydney Games, her brother, visually impaired Paralympic tandem cyclist Kieran Modra, introduced her to tandem cyclist Sarnya Parker, despite Modra's lack of competitive cycling experience, and she became Parker's pilot. She won two gold medals at the Sydney Paralympics with Parker in the Women's 1 km Time Trial Tandem open and Women's Individual Pursuit Tandem open events, for which she received a Medal of the Order of Australia; the pair broke the world record in both events. At the 2000 Games, she also piloted her brother Kieran after his wife Kerry, who was pregnant with the couple's first child, had fainted due to low blood pressure during a quarter-final sprint race.

References

Australian female cyclists
Paralympic cyclists of Australia
Cyclists at the 2000 Summer Paralympics
Medalists at the 2000 Summer Paralympics
Paralympic gold medalists for Australia
Paralympic medalists in cycling
Paralympic sighted guides
Recipients of the Medal of the Order of Australia
Sportswomen from South Australia
Cyclists from South Australia
People from Port Lincoln
People educated at Immanuel College, Adelaide
1975 births
Living people